Gabrielino High School (abbreviated GHS and often referred to as Gab) is a public high school located on San Gabriel Boulevard in San Gabriel, California,  east of downtown Los Angeles, serving the 9th to 12th grades. It was established in 1994. Gabrielino High School is accredited by Western Association of Schools and Colleges (WASC).

Rankings

In addition, Newsweek magazine ranked Gabrielino as one of the United States' top 1000 high schools as determined by the number of Advanced Placement courses taken at the school in 2005 divided by the number of graduating seniors.

In 2007, Gabrielino earned the Silver Medal status from the U.S. News & World Report based on standardized test performance in Math and English and AP courses taken and passed with a "3" or better. Based on this report, Gabrielino is placed in the top 3% of the nation or top 505 schools. About 39% of graduates go on to four-year universities nationwide while about 55% attend community college after graduation. In 2012, Gabrielino High School was nationally ranked the 985th best high school, and the 190th best high school in California.

History

Prior to 1994, high school students belonging to the San Gabriel Unified School District (SGUSD) attended San Gabriel High School, which is part of the Alhambra School District, since SGUSD did not have a high school of its own.

In April 1992, San Gabriel residents won the right to educate their own high school students by ballot measure, winning 61% of votes to establish an autonomous school operated by the SGUSD. In response, the Alhambra School District (ASD) filed a lawsuit alleging that the California Board of Education had improperly excluded Alhambra voters and because ASD stood to lose as much as US$1.8 million in state funding, since the planned high school would siphon away 1,400 students. Homeowners in San Gabriel also led the opposition to a bitterly disputed bond measure, claiming they would fight the district's attempts to raise the funds necessary to build the high school, which would be temporarily situated at the site of the old Jefferson Middle School campus. They complained the high school would cause congestion and lower their property values.

On November 13, 1993, San Gabriel Unified School District officials voted 327 to 241 to name the planned high school "Gabrielino High School," which became the first public building in California to honor the Gabrielino Indians (Tongva people).

On September 8, 1994, Gabrielino High School opened its doors to its first class, teaching 9th graders. Alhambra School District retained responsibility to school 10th to 12th graders until 1995, as part of an agreement signed by both districts in June, the same month Alhambra filed its lawsuit. The school's site on Lafayette Street formerly housed Jefferson Intermediate School, which was moved to the location of the former Madison Elementary School north of Las Tunas Road.

In June 1994, the Los Angeles Superior Court ruled in favor of Alhambra, declaring that the 1992 election was unconstitutional because all the stakeholders had not been allowed to vote in the measure. However, on December 22, 1994, the 2nd District Court of Appeals overturned the previous ruling, declaring that San Gabriel Unified School District residents had a right to independently establish their own boundaries, citing California Board of Education approval. In January 1995, Alhambra School District dropped its case against Gabrielino High School, citing the money and time needed to pursue its goal of shutting down the high school.

On March 20, 1999, an arsonist set a US$2 million fire that destroyed 2 offices and 10 classrooms, effectively displacing 400 of the 1,400 students on campus.

On December 5, 2011, the San Gabriel Unified School District Board voted 3-2 not to renew the contract of Sharon Heinrich, the school's principal, for 2012–2013 school year, citing concerns about her leadership and supervisory abilities, against the opinion of Gabrielino alumni, students and faculty. On January 9, 2012, the Board reversed its previous decision, following the swearing-in of a new board and community outcry.

Architecture 

Gabrielino High School's distinct architecture incorporates cosmopolitan trends and styles. The school's exterior uses bold colors, including shades of orange and red. The campus is built on a  plot bounded by San Gabriel Boulevard to the west, Lafayette Street to the east, Wells Street to the north and Valley Boulevard to the south.

Socioeconomic characteristics 
In the 2010–2011 school year, Gabrielino High served 1,808 students. 51.77% of students were male, while 48.2% were female.

Enrollment by grade in the 2010–2011 school year was:

Student enrollment by ethnic group was:

Gabrielino High School is classified as a Title I school, with 934 students (51.65%) of students eligible for free or reduced lunch.

Extracurricular activities

Speech and Debate 
As of the 2020-2021 schoolyear, Gabrielino is one of California's top five speech and debate teams & ranks #21 in the nation.

Mock Trial
Gabrielino defeated James Monroe High School to win the 2008 Los Angeles County championship.

Swimming
In December 2014, 17-year-old Sean Kim, ranked 7th in the state of California for both the 100 and 200 breaststroke events, making him the 37th nationally ranked recruit overall for the class of 2015.

Track and field
In March 2011, 16-year-old Kevin Chiao, a 110-meter hurdler, ranked among the top 50 in the state of California, making him the first Gabrielino student to do so.

Youth in Government
Since 1996, Gabrielino High School students have participated in a Youth in Government (YIG) program organized in collaboration with the City of San Gabriel's government.

Show Choir
In 2008, Cynthia Talavera became the Choral Director and led the Advanced Show Choir to its first Gold Win in 8 years at the Forum Music Festival at Fullerton College. In 2013, Gabrielino Singers were accepted to sing at the traditional Candlelight Procession and Ceremony at Disneyland.

Notable alumni 
 Ken Gushi (Professional Drift Racer)
 Joanna Wang (Taiwanese singer) - attended until the age of 16; did not graduate.

References

External links
 GHS official website

Educational institutions established in 1994
High schools in Los Angeles County, California
San Gabriel, California
Public high schools in California
1994 establishments in California